Gemma De Ferrari was an Italian film actress of the silent era.

Selected filmography
 Captain Fracasse (1919)
 Samson (1923)
 Tra i sorrisi di Napoli (1926)
 Goodbye Youth (1927)
 The Confessions of a Woman (1928)
 Star of the Sea (1928)
 Napule e Surriento (1929)
 Maratona (1929)

References

Bibliography
 Goble, Alan. The Complete Index to Literary Sources in Film. Walter de Gruyter, 1999.

External links

Year of birth unknown
Year of death unknown
Italian film actresses
Italian silent film actresses
20th-century Italian actresses
Actresses from Naples